Trachykele is a genus of beetles in the family Buprestidae, containing the following species:

 Trachykele blondeli Marseul, 1865
 Trachykele fattigi Knull, 1954
 Trachykele hartmani Burke, 1920
 Trachykele lecontei (Gory, 1841)
 Trachykele nimbosa Fall, 1906
 Trachykele opulenta Fall, 1906

References

Buprestidae genera